The Global University Leaders Forum (GULF), a group of presidents from the world's top 29 universities, was established in 2006. It acts as a community to address educational, scientific and research agendas. 
The current GULF Chair is Suzanne Fortier, Principal and Vice-Chancellor of McGill University. Membership is based on university ranking, individual leadership, geographical diversity, and the university's relevance to the forum's agenda.

A 2018 report by Times Higher Education and Elsevier found that the then-27 GULF members produced 7% of the world's research output, more than any individual country except the United States and China, and are responsible for 15.4% of all research cited in patents, more than any individual country except the United States.

Affiliated Universities

North America 
 California Institute of Technology
 Carnegie Mellon University
 Columbia University
 Georgetown University
 Harvard University
 Massachusetts Institute of Technology
 McGill University
 Princeton University
 Stanford University
 University of California, Berkeley
 University of Chicago
 University of Pennsylvania
 Yale University

Europe 
 Bocconi University
 Cambridge University
 ETH Zürich
 Imperial College London
 Oxford University
 École polytechnique fédérale de Lausanne

Asia 
 Hong Kong University of Science and Technology
 KAIST
 Keio University
 Nanyang Technological University
 National University of Singapore
 Peking University
 Tsinghua University
 University of Tokyo
 Zhejiang University

Africa 
 University of Cape Town

References

External links 
GULF Official Website
GULF Members

2006 establishments
International college and university associations and consortia